Rubén Oswaldo Díaz Figueras (8 January 1946 – 16 January 2018) was an Argentine footballer. He played as a defender for Racing Club in Argentina and Atlético Madrid in Spain. He was nicknamed "Panadero" (baker) because his father owned a bakery.

Biography
"Panadero" Díaz was born in Buenos Aires and started his professional career in 1965 with Racing Club de Avellaneda. In 1966 he was part of the team that won the Argentine league. The following season they won in the Copa Libertadores 1967, the first and only time that Racing Club have been Libertadores champions. Later that year they beat Celtic F.C. of Scotland in the Copa Intercontinental to become the first Argentine team to be crowned club champions of the world.

In 1974 Díaz joined Atlético Madrid where he won a second Copa Intercontinental in 1974, beating Racing Clubs fiercest rivals; Club Atlético Independiente. He also won a Copa del Rey and a league title with Atlético before returning to Argentina in 1977.

"Panadero" returned to Racing Club but only played on until 1978 when he retired from top-class football. He was named in the Clarín all-time Racing Club team.

Diaz died after complications on a planned aortic aneurysm operation at the Favaloro Foundation Hospital

Honours

Club
 Racing Club
Primera División: 1966
Copa Libertadores: 1967
Intercontinental Cup: 1967

 Atlético Madrid
Intercontinental Cup: 1974
Copa del Rey: 1976
Spanish League: 1976–77

References

External links

 

1946 births
2018 deaths
Footballers from Buenos Aires
Argentine footballers
Association football defenders
Argentine Primera División players
La Liga players
Racing Club de Avellaneda footballers
Atlético Madrid footballers
Argentine expatriate footballers
Expatriate footballers in Spain